Veronica peduncularis, the creeping speedwell, is a flowering plant in the plantain family, Plantaginaceae. Listed under its synonym Veronica umbrosa, its cultivar 'Georgia Blue' has gained the Royal Horticultural Society's Award of Garden Merit.

It is a semi-evergreen perennial with alternate, simple leaves on creeping stems. The flowers are blue, and borne in spring. Though hardy, it requires a sheltered spot in full sun with good drainage. It is a suitable subject for a gravel garden or alpine garden.

References

peduncularis
Flora of the Caucasus
Flora of South European Russia
Flora of Turkey
Flora of Ukraine